Westenhellweg is the main shopping street in Dortmund, Germany. With nearly 13,000 visitors per hour it was Germany's most frequented shopping street in 2013.

References

Shopping districts and streets in Germany